Hilda Twongyeirwe is a Ugandan writer and editor. For ten years, she taught English language and literature in secondary school, before she retired to do development work in 2003. She is an editor, a published author of short stories and poetry, and a recipient of a National Medal of the government of Uganda in recognition of her contribution to women's Empowerment through Literary arts (2018). She is also a recipient of a Certificate of Recognition (2008) from the National Book Trust of Uganda for her children's book, Fina the Dancer. She is currently the coordinator of FEMRITE, an organization she participated in founding in 1995. She has edited fiction and creative nonfiction works, the most recent one being, No Time to Mourn (2020) by South Sudanese women. She has also edited others including; I Dare to Say: African Women Share Their Stories of Hope and Survival (2012) and Taboo? Voices of Women on Female Genital Mutilation (2013).

Early life and education
Twongyeirwe was born in Kabale district, south-west Uganda, in Kacerere near Lake Bunyonyi. She graduated with an honours degree in social sciences and a master's degree in public administration and management from Makerere University.

Femrite

She has been a member of FEMRITE since its inception, joining while still a student at Makerere University. She is currently the coordinator of FEMRITE. She has edited fiction and creative nonfiction works, the most recent ones being I Dare to Say: African Women Share Their Stories of Hope and Survival (2012) 
and Taboo? Voices of Women on Female Genital Mutilation (2013). 
She has taken part in a number of projects by FEMRITE over the years, to promote reading and writing, especially in secondary and primary schools.

Writing career
Hilda has published a children's book, Fina the Dancer (2007), which was awarded a certificate of recognition as an outstanding piece of literature for children, and other books in Runyankole Rukiga for primary one and two. Her poetry has appeared in various journals and magazines, including "The Threshold by the Nile", in the Poster Poetry Project anthology. She has published a number of stories with FEMRITE: "Becoming a Woman" in 1998, "Headlines" in 2001, "The Pumpkin Seed" in Pumpkin Seeds, and many others.
  
She was a mentor in the 2013 Writivism workshop. Her story "Baking the National Cake" was published in October 2013 as part of the Words Without Borders project of work by women writing in indigenous African languages. She is a contributor to the 2019 anthology New Daughters of Africa, edited by Margaret Busby.

Published works

Novels

Short stories
 "Let It Be an Angel", in 
 "And If", in 
 "The Intrigue", in 
 "Till we find our voices", in 
 "Headlines", in 
 "This Time Tomorrow", in 
 "The Intrigue", in 
 "Making Ends Meet", in 
 "The Pumpkin Seed", in 
 "Headlines", in 
 "Becoming a Woman", in 
"Baking the National Cake", wordswithoutborders.org, 2013

Poetry
"In conversation", "New Tarmac", in 
 "Sometime, I hear your Voice Mama", in 
 "Mama's Garden of Beans, Papa's Hands, Who Litters?" in 
 "By the Nile, Threshold", in 
 "In Conversation, Breaking Order", in Post-colonial text Volume 8, No. 1 (2013).

Books edited
Hilda Twongyeirwe, Elizabeth Ashamu, Elizabeth Ashamu Deng, eds. (2020). No Time to Mourn. ISBN 9970480170, 9789970480173

References

External links
"Asian, African writers discuss cultural globalisation"
"Possessing the Secret of Joy and Authors in Uganda. FGM, choice – or coercion?"
"Femrite flags off first writers’ caravan"
"Moulding female writers in Africa"
"Book on African women gives power back to victims"
"Summoning the Rains, Hilda Twongyeirwe and Ellen Banda-Aaku (eds)"
"Ugandan Women Writers Shine But Where Are Men?"
 Hilda Twongyeirwe at Twitter @twongye

Living people
People from Kabale District
21st-century Ugandan poets
Makerere University alumni
Ugandan women poets
Ugandan women short story writers
Ugandan short story writers
21st-century short story writers
21st-century Ugandan women writers
Year of birth missing (living people)